Pyatigory is a rural locality (a village) in Kosinskoye Rural Settlement, Kosinsky District, Perm Krai, Russia. The population was 83 as of 2010. There is 1 street.

Geography 
Pyatigory is located 37 km north of Kosa (the district's administrative centre) by road. Podgora is the nearest rural locality.

References 

Rural localities in Kosinsky District